Cello Metal may refer to:

 Cello metal, a subgenre of heavy metal music
 Cello Metal (album), a 2015 album by Tina Guo